ГШ may refer to:

 Gryazev-Shipunov (brand;) Soviet weapons marque
 Glintshake (band) Russian rock band

See also

 
 
 
 GSH (disambiguation)
 GS (disambiguation)